Vimla Swamy (born 1941) is a former Fijian international lawn bowler.

Bowls career
Swamy has represented Fiji at the Commonwealth Games, in the fours event at the 1998 Commonwealth Games.

She won three medals at the Asia Pacific Bowls Championships, including two gold medals in the 1989 pairs at Suva and the 1991 fours at Kowloon.

References

1941 births
Living people
Bowls players at the 1998 Commonwealth Games
Fijian female bowls players